Poelman is a Dutch toponymic surname that translates to "pool man", originally referring to a person who lived near a small lake. The name is most common in the provinces of Drenthe and Groninegen. Alternative spellings include Poelmann and Poelmans. The name may refer to:

Anette Poelman (1853–1914), Dutch suffragist and philanthropist
Anne Osborn Poelman (born 1943), American medical doctor
Frits Poelman, New Zealand football defender
Jacqueline Poelman (born 1973), Dutch sprinter
Ronald E. Poelman (1928–2011), American Mormon leader
Simon Poelman (born 1963), New Zealand decathlete
Poelmann
Boudewijn Poelmann (born 1949), Dutch businessman
Poelmans
Edgard Poelmans (1883–1932), Belgian football defender
Joeri Poelmans (born 1995), Belgian football defender
Kim Poelmans (born 1977), Belgian singer

See also
Polman, Dutch surname of the same origin

References

Dutch-language surnames
Toponymic surnames